Mont-Joli station is a Via Rail station in Mont-Joli, Quebec, Canada. Located on Avenue de la Gare, it is staffed and is wheelchair-accessible. Mont-Joli is currently served by Via Rail's Ocean and was previously served by Montreal–Gaspé train as well until the latter was suspended in 2013. Both trains shared the same rail line between Montreal and Matapédia. 

The Canadian National Railway station is a designated Heritage Railway Station.

References

External links
Via Rail Mont-Joli Station ( Sign Post ) 
Via Rail page for the Ocean
Via Rail page for the Montreal – Gaspé train

Via Rail stations in Quebec
Designated Heritage Railway Stations in Quebec
Railway stations in Bas-Saint-Laurent